Stephen Eugene Fix is an American academic.

Fix graduated from Boston College in 1974, and completed a master's degree followed by a doctorate, both at Cornell University. He is the Robert G Scott '68 Professor of English at Williams College.

References

Living people
Boston College alumni
Cornell University alumni
Williams College faculty
Year of birth missing (living people)
Place of birth missing (living people)